This is a list of Federal Roads in Sarawak.

Main Federal Roads

Other Trunk Roads, Feeder Roads and Access Roads

Malaysian Federal Roads
Federal, Sarawak

References